Bistricioara may refer to the following places in Romania:

Bistricioara, a village in the commune Ceahlău, Neamț County
Bistricioara (Vâlcea), a tributary of the Bistrița (Olt basin) in Vâlcea County
Bistricioara (Tismana), a tributary of the Bistrița (Jiu basin) in Gorj County
Bistricioara (Siret), a tributary of the Bistrița (Siret basin) in Harghita and Neamț Counties

See also 
 Bistra (disambiguation)
 Bistrița (disambiguation)